Phaulomyces is a genus of fungi in the family Laboulbeniaceae. The genus contain 14 species.

References

External links
Phaulomyces at Index Fungorum

Laboulbeniomycetes